Jan Mertl (born 3 January 1982) is a Czech tennis player playing on the ITF Futures Tour and ATP Challenger Tour. On 23 July 2007, he reached his highest ATP singles ranking of 163.

Mertl made his ATP main draw debut at 2016 Swiss Open Gstaad, defeating Yann Marti to score his first ATP-level win.

Challenger finals

Singles: 3 (0–3)

Doubles: 9 (1–8)

References

External links
 
 

1982 births
Living people
Czech male tennis players
Sportspeople from Ústí nad Labem